The 1978 East Carolina Pirates football team was an American football team that represented East Carolina University as an independent during the 1978 NCAA Division I-A football season. In their fifth season under head coach Pat Dye, the team compiled a 9–3 record.

Schedule

References

East Carolina
East Carolina Pirates football seasons
Independence Bowl champion seasons
East Carolina Pirates football